Bolo Na Tumi Aamar is a 2010 romantic comedy movie directed by Sujit Mondal and starring Dev and Koel Mallick in lead roles with Sabyasachi Chakraborty, Mousumi Saha and Tota Roy Chowdhury in supporting roles. The music was scored by Jeet Ganguly. The film was released on 15 January 2010. The film was a remake of the 2006 Telugu movie Happy. It was Super-hit at the box-office. It was the second highest grossing movie in 2010.

Plot
Abhishek meets Madhurima, a medical student in North Bengal. After they return to Kolkata, they keep bumping into each other. Abhishek works as a pizza delivery boy. Madhurima’s marriage is fixed with Soumyadeep Sen, a cop, as her father saw her with Abishek on her scooter. Since it was Abhishek's fault, he wants to help Madhurima, so he tells Soumyadeep that he loves Madhurima. Soumyadeep, being a very "nice guy", calls off the marriage. Meanwhile, Madhurima's father fixes her marriage with another man, so Soumyadeep whisks them away and gets them married. They stay in a huge flat belonging to Soumyadeep. A line is drawn in the house so they don’t cross the line, as they stay separately. After a few days, Madhurima requires 2 lakhs (50,00f0 at first) immediately as fees begin to appear for her exams. They slowly become friends and indulge in their relations more. After Madhurima had her exam, she saw that she failed in one subject. Thinking that it was Abhishek's fault, she insults him on his birthday and asks for divorce and to leave the flat. Abhishek then doubles up as a stuntman, signs a contract and quietly goes and pays the money without informing Madhurima, as he was falling in love with her. When the results come out, Madhurima becomes the all India topper. She longs to meet Abhishek whom she had asked to leave the house and discovers that he is in the hospital, as he had injured himself while performing a dangerous stunt. On her way to meet him, Madhurima is taken into custody on false charges by a cop, Inspector Rudra, who wanted to get revenge on her father, a retired cop. Abhishek lands there after getting a call from Madhurima, who had managed to call him from another person’s phone. He starts beating the cops, but gets beaten black and blue himself. He manages to get up and start beating the cops again, nearly killing Rudra. Soumyadeep appears there and stops him, then asks Madhurima’s father to accept them; he does so readily.

Cast
 Dev as Abhishek Dutta
 Koel Mallick as Madhurima Chatterjee, an MBBS student
 Sabyasachi Chakraborty as retired DIG Indrajit Chatterjee, Madhurima's father
 Tota Roy Chowdhury as Soumyadeep Sen (A sincere Police Inspector, who was supposed to marry Madhurima)
 Gopal Talukdar as Abir's best friend
 Mousumi Saha as Madhurima's mother
 Supriyo Dutta as Pizza Hotel owner
 Bharat Kaul as a corrupt DIG, Rudra
 Sumit Ganguly as a Fight Master
 Manishankar Banerjee as Professor
 Nitya Ganguly as Abhi's uncle (special appearance)

Soundtrack

The soundtrack features 6 songs composed by Jeet Gannguli and Yuvan Shankar Raja with lyrics written by Priyo Chattopadhyay, Chandrani Gannguli and Gautam Sushmit.

Awards
ZEE Bangla Gourav Samman Award for Best Film (Bolo Na Tumi Amar, 2010) - Nominated and ZEE Bangla Gourav Samman Award for Best Actress (Bolo Na Tumi Amar, 2010) winner.

References 

Indian romantic comedy films
2010 films
2010s Bengali-language films
Bengali-language Indian films
Bengali remakes of Telugu films
2010 romantic comedy films